The 1956 Omloop Het Volk was the 12th edition of the Omloop Het Volk cycle race and was held on 11 March 1956. The race started and finished in Ghent. The race was won by Ernest Sterckx.

General classification

References

1956
Omloop Het Nieuwsblad
Omloop Het Nieuwsblad